Duck River may refer to:

Australia
Duck River (New South Wales), a tributary of the Parramatta River
Duck River (Tasmania)

Canada
Duck River (Minganie), Rivière-au-Tonnerre, in Minganie Regional County Municipality, Côte-Nord, Quebec

United States
Duck River (Alabama), a tributary of the Mulberry Fork of the Black Warrior River
Duck River (Connecticut), a tidal river in Old Lyme
Duck River (Michigan)
Duck River (Tennessee), a tributary of the Tennessee River

See also
Little Duck River, Tennessee
Black Duck River (disambiguation)
Duck (disambiguation)